The 2021–22 Canisius Golden Griffins men's ice hockey season was the 42nd season of play for the program, the 24th at the Division I level, and the 19th season in the Atlantic Hockey conference. The Golden Griffins represented Canisius College and were coached by Trevor Large, in his 5th season.

Season
Canisius got off to a good start, winning games against three non-conference opponents and tying Clarkson, who finished the season in the top-20. Despite shoeing promise early, the Golden Griffins played inconsistently once their conference schedule began. While they led the Atlantic Hockey standings early, the team could only complete two weekend sweeps all season.

Canisius received very capable goaltending from Jacob Barczewski but their offense was hit-or-miss. The Golden Griffins were limited to less than 3 goals in 18 games during the season with their leading goal-scorer, Max Kouznetsov, hitting just 12 for the year. In spite of their occasional offensive struggles, Canisius benefitted from Atlantic Hockey being a mediocre conference and finished in second place.

The Golden Griffins opened their postseason run with a home date against Mercyhurst but their offense failed them at the worst time. Canisius fired 63 shots on goal in two games but could only get a single marker in each contest. They lost the series, including a double overtime match in game 1, and would have to wait for another year.

Departures

Recruiting

Roster
As of August 23, 2021.

Standings

Schedule and results

|-
!colspan=12 style=";" | Regular Season

|-
!colspan=12 style=";" | 

|- align="center" bgcolor="#e0e0e0"
|colspan=12|Canisius Lost Series 0–2

Scoring statistics

Goaltending statistics

Rankings

Note: USCHO did not release a poll in week 24.

Awards and honors

References

2021–22
2021–22 Atlantic Hockey men's ice hockey season
2021–22 NCAA Division I men's ice hockey by team
2021 in sports in New York (state)
2022 in sports in New York (state)